Pike County Courthouse is a historic county courthouse located at Milford, Pike County, Pennsylvania.  It was built in 1873, and is a 2 1/2-story, eight bay by six bay, brick building in the Second Empire style.  It features a projecting front section with pediment and a square cupola.

It was added to the National Register of Historic Places in 1979.

See also
 List of state and county courthouses in Pennsylvania

References

County courthouses in Pennsylvania
Courthouses on the National Register of Historic Places in Pennsylvania
Second Empire architecture in Pennsylvania
Government buildings completed in 1873
Buildings and structures in Pike County, Pennsylvania
National Register of Historic Places in Pike County, Pennsylvania